Ren Changxia (February 8, 1964 – April 14, 2004) was a Chinese policewoman. After a distinguished career in Zhengzhou, she became the first female police chief in the province of Henan when she was named the director and party secretary of the party committee of Dengfeng Public security bureau in 2001. In the three years to follow, she carried out successful reform within her department, fought hard against local criminal syndicates (many with ties with corrupt government officials) and crimes, assisted poorer communities, and received over 3,400 complainants in person.

Ren was killed in an apparent car accident. Upon receiving news of her death, over 200,000 Dengfeng citizens poured the streets to mourn her, despite the fact she was only in Dengfeng for three years. Impressed by her influence on the Chinese populace, then General Secretary of the Chinese Communist Party Hu Jintao, premier of the State Council Wen Jiabao and secretary of the Central Political and Legal Affairs Commission Luo Gan called for a national propaganda campaign for cadres to study from her.

Death
Ren died on the night of April 14, 2004 on Expressway S85 from Zhengzhou to Dengfeng. She was in the back row when a truck rear-ended her vehicle, but her chauffeur was completely unharmed. Some locals believe Ren was assassinated by corrupt government officials or criminal syndicates with links to corrupt government officials.

In popular culture
A 2005 film starring Zhang Yu and a 2005 TV series starring Liu Jia under the same name based on her life have been produced. Both were well received. The TV series is believed to be the highest-rated propaganda drama in China at the time.

References
Ren Changxia: a heroic policewoman
Ren Changxia 
Senior leaders call on nationwide learning of model policewoman

1964 births
2004 deaths
Chinese communists
Chinese police officers
People from Shangqiu
Road incident deaths in the People's Republic of China
Women police officers